The Fair Play Award in Major League Soccer was the award that was given to an individual player and a team who presented best overall sportsmanlike behavior in addition to receiving one of the lowest numbers of yellow and red cards, fouls and disciplinary violations.

Individual winners

Team winners

References

Major League Soccer trophies and awards
Sportsmanship trophies and awards